Carolina Country Music Fest (CCMF) is an outdoor country music festival that takes place in June of each year in Myrtle Beach, South Carolina. The festival was founded in 2015 by Charlotte-based company Full House Productions.

Carolina Country Music Fest is held at the Myrtle Beach Boardwalk within the Burroughs and Chapin Pavilion Place (former Myrtle Beach Pavilion site). and is a three-day (Friday through Sunday) country music festival that begins with the McDonald's® Thursday Night Kick-Off Concert Powered by MyrtleBeach.com on Thursday evening. The premiere event in 2015 brought in over 20,000 attendees, while the second year (2016) brought in 25,000. The 2017 CCMF welcomed 30,000 people to the festival.  In 2020, the festival was cancelled due to COVID-19, but was welcomed to Myrtle Beach once again from June 10–13, 2021.  The sold-out 2021 festival drew an estimated 35,000 attendees.

The Carolina Country Music Fest spans 18 acres of coastal area from the boardwalk to Ocean Boulevard, and added a fifth stage in 2021 to accommodate more artists and larger crowds. The stages include the Coors Light Main Stage, the Crown Royal Stage, Bluemoon Sound Stage and the Coca-Cola Stage + the private artist ZYN stage. The fifth annual Carolina Country Music Fest was held June 6–9, 2019. The annual event has sold out two years in a row (2021, 2022).

On February 10, 2022, it was announced the CCMF was nominated for festival of the year by the Academy of Country Music Awards. CCMF is one of five events in the running for festival of the year

History

2015
The 2015 Carolina Country Music Fest was held Thursday, June 3 through Sunday, June 7, 2015 and hosted over 20,000 attendees. The full lineup included Outshyne, Davisson Brothers Band, Cole Swindell, Big & Rich, Brandon Bailey, Brian Davis, Brooke Eden, Colt Ford, Corey Smith, Darrell Harwood, David Nail, Dee Jay Silver, Dirty Grass Soul, Early Ray, Eric Church, Gal Friday, Georgia Satellites, Hunter Hayes, John King, Kellie Pickler, Kuntry Boys, Lady Antebellum, Margaret Valentine, Marshall Tucker Band, Mikele Buck, Mo Pitney, Morgan's Road, Rainey Qualley, Rascal Flatts, Ricky Young, Rodney Atkins, Sam Hunt, Taylor Centers, Christina Taylor, Trent Tomlinson, Tim Cifers and multiple Battle of the Bands contest winners

2016
The 2016 Carolina Country Music Fest was held Thursday, June 9 through Sunday, June 12, 2016 and hosted 25,000 attendees. The full lineup included Chris Lane, Chase Rice, Cole Swindell, David Ray, Dee Jay Silver, Florida Georgia Line, Gary Allen, Gyth Rigdon, Jake Owen, Kane Brown, Keith Urban, Kelsea Ballerini, Kurt Stevens, Lauren Jenkins, Lewis Brice, Maren Morris, Morgan Myles, Shawn Bilton, Tim McGraw, A Thousand Horses, Chase Bryant, Joe Nichols, Michael Ray, Outshyne, The Cadillac Three and multiple Battle of the Bands contest winners

2017
The 2017 Carolina Country Music Fest was held Thursday, June 8 through Sunday, June 11, 2017 and hosted 30,000 attendees. The full lineup included Montgomery Gentry, Brett Young, Trent Tomlinson, Darrell Harwood, Walker McGuire, Taylor Norris, Dee Jay Silver, Darius Rucker, Billy Currington, Kip Moore, Parmalee, Morgan Myles, Luke Combs, Lewis Brice, Kennedy Fitzsimmons, Kenny Chesney, Lee Brice, Granger Smith, Chris Lane, Lanco, Davisson Brothers, Love & Theft, Kevin Mac, Lauren Jenkins, Jason Aldean, Chris Young, Big & Rich, Gretchen Wilson, Drake White & The Big Fire, Jordan Rager, Runaway June, Jordan Davis, Zach Seabaugh and multiple Battle of the Bands contest winners

2018
The 2018 Carolina Country Music Fest was held Thursday, June 7 through Sunday, June 10, 2018, and hosted over 30,000 attendees. The full lineup included Luke Bryan, Toby Keith, Zac Brown Band, Cole Swindell, Tracy Lawrence, Chris Lane, Brett Young, Brett Eldredge, Old Dominion, Kane Brown, Russell Dickerson, Michael Ray, Runaway June, Craig Morgan, Deana Carter, Dee Jay Silver, Morgan Wallen, Colt Ford, Lewis Brice, Jimmie Allen, Josh Phillips, Stephanie Quayle, Tim Montana, Kennedy Fitzsimmons, Shawn Bilton, Dylan Scott, Caleb Gilbert, Jordan Middleton + The Low End, McGuire, Warrick McZeke, Ryan Trotti, Dustin Chapman, Yesterday's Wine, James Barker Band, Jon Langston, Devin Dawson, Bryan Mayer, Davisson Brothers, Kasey Tyndall, and Muscadine Bloodline.

2019 
The 2019 Carolina Country Music Fest was held Thursday, June 6 through Sunday, June 9, 2019, and hosted over 30,000 attendees. The lineup included Alabama, Dierks Bentley, Thomas Rhett, Gyth Rigdon, Travis Denning, Morgan Evans, Ryan Trotti, Sweet Tea Trio, High Valley, Smithfield, Gabby Barrett, Jimmie Allen, Randy Houser, Brothers Osbourne, Trey Landon, Mitchell Tenpenny, Warrick Mczeke, Delta Rae, Gone West, CAM, Dan + Shey, Florida Georgia Line, Matt Stell, Filmore, John Gurney, Dylan Schneider, Rhett Akins, Midland, Kevin MaC, Yesterday's Wine, Dustin Lynch, Trea Landon, The Kyle Dills Band and multiple Battle of the Bands contest winners.

2020 
As with nearly all festivals and major events in 2020, CCMF was unable to hold their annual event for the first time since it began in 2015. CCMF was originally scheduled for June 4 – 7, 2020, but was rescheduled to September 17 – 20, 2020 due to concerns surrounding the coronavirus pandemic. While a number of other large events also moved their dates to Fall of 2020, the event was still able to secure nearly their entire original lineup. Unfortunately, as the pandemic continued and it became apparent that a gathering of that size would not be able to be done safely, CCMF announced on August 11, 2020, that it would be rescheduling their upcoming festival to June 2021.

2021 
Tuesday April 12, 2021, it was announced that Myrtle Beach City Council granted the organizers a special event permit for the four-day music festival.  The annual Carolina Country Music Fest made its return to Myrtle Beach June 10–13 of 2021. The festival brought back nearly all of its 2020 artist lineup, including major headliners Luke Combs, Eric Church, Darius Rucker and Jake Owen. On January 14, 2021, it was announced that Rodney Atkins and LoCash were added to the lineup. The sold-out event drew an estimated 35,000 attendees.

2022 
The annual Carolina Country Music Fest was held Thursday, June 9 through Sunday, June 12, 2022. The festival was host to over 30 artists across four unique stages on the festival grounds. The lineup included Luke Bryan, Jason Aldean, Keith Urban, Chase Rice, Chris Lane, Riley Green , Jon Pardi, LoCash, Jimmie Allen,  Gabby Barrett, The Marshall Tucker Band, Rodney Atkins, Chris Janson, Elvie Shane, Tenille Townes, Frank Ray, Brittney Spencer, Jukebox Rehab, Lewis Brice, Neon Union and more. The once again sold-out event drew 35,000 attendees.

2023 
The seventh annual Carolina Country Music Fest® will be held June 8 – 11, 2023. On July 22, 2022, it was announced that Morgan Wallen will be a headliner for CCMF in 2023. On August 12,2022, it was announced that Miranda Lambert will be the first female country artist in CCMF history to headline one of the nights at the Carolina Country Music Fest.  On August 13, 2022, it was announced that CCMF has sold out their mainstage VIP tickets for 2023 festival. Also announced was that 2 more headline acts to be announced and also that general admission tickets are available to purchase.

Attendance

Artists
Each year, CCMF hosts 30 of country's headlining artists plus up-and-coming, regional and local acts. 
This table is up to date as of 12/25/2022 and is based on the official CCMF website 2023 artist lineup.

References

2015 establishments in South Carolina
Country music festivals in the United States
Music festivals in South Carolina
Music festivals established in 2015
Myrtle Beach, South Carolina
Tourist attractions in Myrtle Beach, South Carolina
June events